Birdik (formerly: Denisovka) is a village in the Chüy Region of Kyrgyzstan. Its population was 2,076 in 2021.

References

Populated places in Chüy Region